Fagus sylvatica, the European beech or common beech is a deciduous tree belonging to the beech family Fagaceae.

Description 

It has a typical lifespan of 150–200 years, though sometimes up to 300 years. In cultivated forest stands trees are normally harvested at 80–120 years of age. 30 years are needed to attain full maturity (as compared to 40 for American beech). In open locations, it will become much shorter (typically ) and more massive.

When crenate, there is one point at each vein tip, never any points between the veins.

The leaves of beech are often not abscissed (dropped) in the autumn and instead remain on the tree until the spring. This process is called marcescence. This particularly occurs when trees are saplings or when plants are clipped as a hedge (making beech hedges attractive screens, even in winter), but it also often continues to occur on the lower branches when the tree is mature.

Small quantities of seeds may be produced around 10 years of age, but not a heavy crop until the tree is at least 30 years old. F. sylvatica male flowers are borne in the small catkins which are a hallmark of the Fagales order (beeches, chestnuts, oaks, walnuts, hickories, birches, and hornbeams). Flower and seed production is particularly abundant in years following a hot, sunny and dry summer, though rarely for two years in a row.

Distribution and habitat 

The natural range extends from southern Sweden to northern Sicily, west to France, southern England, northern Portugal, central Spain, and east to northwest Turkey, where it intergrades with the oriental beech (Fagus orientalis), which replaces it further east. In the Balkans, it shows some hybridisation with oriental beech; these hybrid trees are named Fagus × taurica Popl. [Fagus moesiaca (Domin, Maly) Czecz.]. In the southern part of its range around the Mediterranean, it grows only in mountain forests, at  altitude.

Although often regarded as native in southern England, recent evidence suggests that F. sylvatica did not arrive in England until about 4000 BC, or 2,000 years subsequent to the English Channel forming following the ice ages; it could have been an early introduction by Stone Age humans, who used the nuts for food. The beech is classified as a native in the south of England and as a non-native in the north where it is often removed from 'native' woods. Localised pollen records have been recorded in the North of England from the Iron Age by Sir Harry Godwin. Changing climatic conditions may put beech populations in southern England under increased stress and while it may not be possible to maintain the current levels of beech in some sites it is thought that conditions for beech in north-west England will remain favourable or even improve. It is often planted in Britain. Similarly, the nature of Norwegian beech populations is subject to debate. If native, they would represent the northern range of the species. However, molecular genetic analyses support the hypothesis that these populations represent intentional introduction from Denmark before and during the Viking Age. However, the beech in Vestfold and at Seim north of Bergen in Norway is now spreading naturally and regarded as native.

Though not demanding of its soil type, the European beech has several significant requirements: a humid atmosphere (precipitation well distributed throughout the year and frequent fogs) and well-drained soil (being intolerant of excessive stagnant water). It prefers moderately fertile ground, calcified or lightly acidic, therefore it is found more often on the side of a hill than at the bottom of clayey basin. It tolerates rigorous winter cold, but is sensitive to spring frost. In Norway's oceanic climate planted trees grow well north to Bodø, and produce seedlings and can spread naturally in Trondheim. In Sweden, beech trees do not grow as far north as in Norway.

A beech forest is very dark and few species of plant are able to survive there, where the sun barely reaches the ground. Young beeches prefer some shade and may grow poorly in full sunlight. In a clear-cut forest a European beech will germinate and then die of excessive dryness. Under oaks with sparse leaf cover it will quickly surpass them in height and, due to the beech's dense foliage, the oaks will die from lack of sunlight.

Ecology 
The root system is shallow, even superficial, with large roots spreading out in all directions. European beech forms ectomycorrhizas with a range of fungi including many Russula species, as well as Laccaria amethystina, and with the species Ramaria flavosaponaria. Tomentella Pat. species and Cenococcum geophilum have been found in Danish and Spanish beech forests. These fungi are important in enhancing uptake of water and nutrients from the soil.

In the woodlands of southern Britain, beech is dominant over oak and elm south of a line from about north Suffolk across to Cardigan. Oak are the dominant forest trees north of this line. One of the most beautiful European beech forests called Sonian Forest (Forêt de Soignes/Zoniënwoud) is found in the southeast of Brussels, Belgium. Beech is a dominant tree species in France and constitutes about 10% of French forests. The largest virgin forests made of beech trees are Uholka-Shyrokyi Luh in Ukraine and Izvoarele Nerei ( in one forest body) in Semenic-Cheile Carașului National Park, Romania. These habitats are the home of Europe's largest predators, (the brown bear, the grey wolf and the lynx). Many trees are older than 350 years in Izvoarele Nerei and even 500 years in Uholka-Shyrokyi Luh.

Spring leaf budding by the European beech is triggered by a combination of day length and temperature. Bud break each year is from the middle of April to the beginning of May, often with remarkable precision (within a few days).

The European beech invests significantly in summer and autumn for the following spring. Conditions in summer, particularly good rainfall, determine the number of leaves included in the buds. In autumn, the tree builds the reserves that will sustain it into spring. Given good conditions, a bud can produce a shoot with ten or more leaves. The terminal bud emits a hormonal substance in the spring that halts the development of additional buds. This tendency, though very strong at the beginning of their existence, becomes weaker in older trees.

It is only after the budding that root growth of the year begins. The first roots to appear are very thin (with a diameter of less than 0.5 mm). Later, after a wave of above ground growth, thicker roots grow in a steady fashion.

Pathogens 
Biscogniauxia nummularia (beech tarcrust) is an ascomycete primary pathogen of beech trees, causing strip-canker and wood rot. It can be found at all times of year and is not edible.

Cultivation 

European beech is a very popular ornamental tree in parks and large gardens in temperate regions of the world. In North America, they are preferred for this purpose over the native F. grandifolia, which despite its tolerance of warmer climates, is slower growing, taking an average of 10 years longer to attain maturity. The town of Brookline, Massachusetts has one of the largest, if not the largest, grove of European beech trees in the United States. The  public park, called 'The Longwood Mall', was planted sometime before 1850 qualifying it as the oldest stand of European beeches in the United States.

It is frequently kept clipped to make attractive hedges.

Since the early 19th century there have been numerous cultivars of European beech made by horticultural selection, often repeatedly; they include:
 copper beech or purple beech (Fagus sylvatica purpurea) – a mutation of the European beech which was first noted in 1690 in the "Possenwald" forest near the town of Sondershausen in Thuringia, Germany. It is assumed that about 99% of all copper beeches in the world are descendants of this copper beech. Its leaves are purple, in many selections turning deep spinach green by mid-summer. In the United States Charles Sprague Sargent noted the earliest appearance in a nurseryman's catalogue in 1820, but in 1859 "the finest copper beech in America... more than fifty feet high" was noted in the grounds of Thomas Ash, Esq., Throggs Neck, New York; it must have been more than forty years old at the time.
 fern-leaf beech (Fagus sylvatica Heterophylla Group) – leaves deeply serrated to thread-like
 dwarf beech (Fagus sylvatica Tortuosa Group) – distinctive twisted trunk and branches
 weeping beech (Fagus sylvatica Pendula Group) – branches pendulous
 Dawyck beech (Fagus sylvatica 'Dawyck') – fastigiate (columnar) growth – occurs in green, gold and purple forms; named after Dawyck Botanic Garden in the Scottish Borders
 golden beech (Fagus sylvatica 'Zlatia') – leaves golden in spring

Cultivars
The following cultivars have gained the Royal Horticultural Society's Award of Garden Merit:-

F. sylvatica 
'Dawyck' 
'Dawyck Gold' 
'Dawyck Purple' 
'Pendula' (weeping beech) 
'Riversii' 
F. sylvatica var. heterophylla 'Aspleniifolia'

Uses 
The nuts are eaten by humans and animals. Slightly toxic to humans if eaten in large quantities due to the tannins and alkaloids they contain, the nuts were nonetheless pressed to obtain an oil in 19th-century England that was used for cooking and in lamps. They were also ground to make flour, which could be eaten after the tannins were leached out by soaking.

Primary Product AM 01, a smoke flavouring, is produced from Fagus sylvatica L.

Timber 
The wood of the European beech is used in the manufacture of numerous objects and implements. Its fine and short grain makes it an easy wood to work with, easy to soak, dye, varnish and glue. Steaming makes the wood even easier to machine. It has an excellent finish and is resistant to compression and splitting and it is stiff when flexed. Milling is sometimes difficult due to cracking. It is particularly well suited for minor carpentry, particularly furniture. From chairs to parquetry (flooring) and staircases, the European beech can do almost anything other than heavy structural support, so long as it is not left outdoors. Its hardness make it ideal for making wooden mallets and workbench tops. The wood rots easily if it is not protected by a tar based on a distillate of its own bark (as used in railway sleepers). It is better for paper pulp than many other broadleaved trees though is only sometimes used for this, the high cellulose content can also be spun into modal, which is used as a textile akin to cotton. Common beech is also considered one of the best firewoods for fireplaces.

Gallery

References

External links 

Beech Tree Collection – Photographs By Louis K. Meisel, NY
Images, location details, and measurements of remarkable beeches
Den virtuella floran – Distribution
Fagus sylvatica – distribution map, genetic conservation units and related resources. European Forest Genetic Resources Programme (EUFORGEN)

Edible nuts and seeds
sylvatica
Flora of Great Britain
Flora of Belgium
Flora of Europe
Flora of Germany
Flora of Italy
Flora of Montenegro
Flora of Portugal
Flora of Spain
Flora of Sweden
Flora of Turkey
Flora of Ukraine
Garden plants of Europe
Ornamental trees
Plants described in 1753
Taxa named by Carl Linnaeus
Trees of Europe
Trees of humid continental climate
Trees of mild maritime climate
Trees of temperate climates